8-Oxoguanine (8-hydroxyguanine, 8-oxo-Gua, or OH8Gua) is one of the most common DNA lesions resulting from reactive oxygen species modifying guanine, and can result in a mismatched pairing with adenine resulting in G to T and C to A substitutions in the genome. In humans, it is primarily repaired by DNA glycosylase OGG1. It can be caused by ionizing radiation, in connection with oxidative metabolism.

In body fluids

Increased concentrations of 8-oxoguanine in body fluids have been found to be associated with increased risk of mutagenesis and carcinogenesis.

Care must be taken in the assay of 8-oxoguanine due to the ease with which it can be oxidised during extraction and the assay procedure.

Cancer, aging, infertility

The role of the deoxyriboside form of 8-oxoguanine, 8-oxo-2'-deoxyguanosine (abbreviated 8-oxo-dG or 8-OHdG) in cancer and aging also applies to 8-oxoguanine.  Oxoguanine glycosylase is employed in the removal of 8-oxoguanine from DNA by the process of base excision repair.  As described in oxoguanine glycosylase, deficient expression of this enzyme causes 8-oxoguanine to accumulate in DNA. This accumulation may then lead upon replication of DNA to mutations including some that contribute to carcinogenesis.  8-oxoguanine is usually formed by the interaction of reactive oxygen species (ROS) with the guanine base in DNA under conditions of oxidative stress; as noted in the article about them, such species may have a role in aging and male infertility, and 8-oxoguanine can be used to measure such stress.

References

DNA repair
Purines